Heraldo Weiss (31 August 1917 – 30 August 1952) was an Argentine tennis player.

Biography
Weiss was born in Lomas de Zamora, Buenos Aires, Argentina on 31 August 1917. He won a silver medal at the Pan American Games. He was one of Argentina's best tennis players between the 1940s and 1950s. He reached the eighth finals (fourth round) in the men's single tournament of Roland Garros in 1948. He also distinguished himself in several international competitions, notably in the United Kingdom and in Germany as in Baden-Baden in 1950, where he dominated Gottfried von Cramm and faced Jaroslav Drobný (a finalist in Roland-Garros three months earlier) in the final.

Weiss reached the fourth round in Wimbledon mixed tournament three times: in 1948, 1949, and 1950 (in 1949 with his wife). He was captain of the Argentina Davis Cup team. He played two Davis Cup matches with the Argentine Team against Belgium in Brussels in 1948.

He was the husband of tennis champion Mary Terán de Weiss. Weiss died in 1952.

Career finals

Singles

References

External links
 
 
 

Argentine male tennis players
1952 deaths
1917 births
People from Lomas de Zamora
Sportspeople from Buenos Aires Province
20th-century Argentine people